Yuzhnaya Bay is one of the harbour bays in Sevastopol.

On March 22, 2014, during the 2014 Russian military intervention in Ukraine, Russian forces captured the only Ukrainian submarine, known as the Zaporizhya, and took it to Yuzhnaya Bay, according to Vladislav Seleznyov, a spokesman for the Ukrainian military.

References

Bays of Sevastopol